The .22 PPC is a centerfire rifle cartridge developed in 1974 by Dr. Louis Palmisano and Ferris Pindell, primarily as a benchrest cartridge. The cartridge is based on the 5.6×39mm (.220 Russian) case which is a necked-down version of the 7.62×39mm Soviet military cartridge. Several companies have made custom guns in this caliber, however no major companies did until 1993, when Ruger announced their No. 1 V and M77 varmint rifles in this caliber.

Changes from the .220 Russian cartridge 
The changes from the .220 Russian into the .22 PPC include a 10-degree body taper and 30-degree shoulder angle, as well as expanding the neck to accept the standard  diameter bullet used in the U.S. Cases are made in Finland by Sako or in Sweden by Norma and use Small Rifle primers. A 1 in 14-inch (1 in 355 mm) twist has become pretty much standard for these rifles although 1 in 12-inch (1 in 305 mm) twist will sometimes be found, depending on the load and bullet weight.

See also
 6mm PPC
 World Benchrest Shooting Federation
 Table of handgun and rifle cartridges

External links

Pistol and rifle cartridges
Wildcat cartridges